The FIFA Presidential Award was a FIFA association football award given annually at the FIFA World Player Gala. It was first awarded by the then President of FIFA Sepp Blatter in 2001, and has not been awarded since 2014 due to Blatter's suspension from all football activities in 2015.

Winners

Notes

A: President of the Iraqi Football Association at the time.
B:The German coach of the Iraq national football team at the time.
C: Iraq national football team captain at the time.

References

Presidential Award
Awards established in 2001